Ginglymodi is a clade of ray-finned fish containing modern-day gars (Lepisosteidae) and their extinct relatives, including the family Lepidotidae and the orders Semionotiformes and Kyphosichthyiformes, and various other extinct taxa. Ginglymodi is one of the two major subgroups of the infraclass Holostei, the other one being Halecomorphi, which contains the bowfin and its fossil relatives.

Fossil record
The fossil record of ginglymodians goes back at least to the Anisian stage of the Triassic period, over 240 million years ago. Eosemionotus is one of the earliest ginglymodians. Acentrophorus, another taxon from the Wuchiapingian stage of the late Permian, and Paracentrophorus from the Early Triassic epoch, could be even earlier members of the group. Ginglymodi was diverse and widespread during the Mesozoic era, but they represent a depauperate lineage today. The group first evolved in marine environments, but several lineages made separate transitions into freshwater environments. The earliest known gars are from the Late Jurassic, and gar fossils have been found on all continents except Australia and Antarctica. Only seven species exist today, distributed in the freshwater systems of North America.

References 

 
Vertebrate unranked clades
Anisian first appearances
Extant Middle Triassic first appearances
Taxa named by Edward Drinker Cope